Roberto Chiappa (born 11 September 1973) is an Italian track cyclist born in Terni. He is a 44 time Italian Champion and became World Junior Sprint Champion in 1991 as well as World Champion in 1993 at the Tandem. He holds the Italian 200m Record in 10.18s. He rode at four Olympic Games.

Career highlights

1990
, World U19 Sprint Championship, Middlesbrough (GBR)
1991
 World U19 Sprint Champion, Colorado Springs (USA)
1992
4th, Olympic Games, Sprint, Barcelona (SPA)
1993
 World Amateur Tandem Champion, Hamar (NOR-with Federico Paris)
1994
, World Amateur Tandem Championship, Palermo (ITA-with Federico Paris)
1996
3rd, World Cup, Track, Sprint, Busto Garolfo (ITA)
9th, Olympic Games, Sprint, Atlanta (USA)
1997
 World Military Sprint Champion
1998
1st, World Cup, Track, Keirin, Hyères (FRA)
1999
1st, World Cup, Track, Keirin, Mexico City (MEX)
2nd, World Cup, Track, Keirin, Frisco, Texas (USA)
, European Omnium Sprints Championship
2000
7th, Olympic Games, Sprint, Sydney (AUS)
2004
 Keirin Champion, Pordenone
 Sprint Champion, Pordenone
2005
 Keirin Champion, San Vincenzo
 Sprint Champion, San Vincenzo
2006
 Keirin Champion, Pordenone
 Sprint Champion, Pordenone
 Team Sprint Champion, Pordenone
7th, World Sprint Championship, Bordeaux (FRA)
7th, World Keirin Championship, Bordeaux (FRA)
2007
 Keirin Champion, Dalmine
 Sprint Champion, Dalmine
 Team Sprint Champion, Dalmine (with Ivan Quaranta & Marco Brossa)
1st, International Sprint Grand Prix, Trexlertown, Pennsylvania (USA)
1st, Keirin, Air Products Finals, Trexlertown, Pennsylvania (USA)
2nd, World Cup, Track, Sprint, Los Angeles (USA)
7th, World Sprint Championship, Palma de Mallorca (SPA)
2008
1st, World Cup, Track, Sprint, Los Angeles (USA)
4th, World Sprint Championship, Manchester (GBR)
1st, International Keirin Cup, Trexlertown, Pennsylvania (USA)
 Keirin Champion, Dalmine
 Sprint Champion, Dalmine
 Team Sprint Champion, Dalmine

References

External links

1973 births
Living people
People from Terni
Italian male cyclists
Italian track cyclists
Olympic cyclists of Italy
Cyclists at the 1992 Summer Olympics
Cyclists at the 1996 Summer Olympics
Cyclists at the 2000 Summer Olympics
Cyclists at the 2008 Summer Olympics
Cyclists from Umbria
Sportspeople from the Province of Terni
20th-century Italian people
21st-century Italian people